Daddi Cool (born in Makeni, Sierra Leone) is a Sierra Leonean-born Guinean reggae musician. He was born and raised in Makeni, Sierra Leone. Daddi Cool served in the Sierra Leonean army, but fled the country during the early years of the Sierra Leone civil war and moved to Conakry, Guinea.

In 1998, he released his most successful album called Daddi Cool. His first single was called "Waloo", which means "stop" in the Susu language. The song protest against black people bleaching their skin. It was a popular hit throughout West Africa, particularly in Guinea and Sierra Leone.

References

Guinean male singers
Reggae musicians
Living people
People from Makeni
People from Conakry
Year of birth missing (living people)